Rao Bahadur Vappala Pangunni Menon, CSI, CIE (30 September 1893 – 31 December 1965) was an Indian civil servant who served as Secretary to the Government of India in the Ministry of the States, under Sardar Patel.

By appointment from Viceroy and Governor-General of India Wavell, he also served as Secretary to the Governor-General (Public) and later as Secretary to the Cabinet. He also was the Constitutional Adviser and  Political Reforms Commissioner to the last three successive Viceroys (Linlithgow, Wavell and Mountbatten) during British rule in India.  In May 1948, at the initiative of V. P. Menon, a meeting was held in Delhi between the Rajpramukhs of the princely unions and the States Department, at the end of which the Rajpramukhs signed new Instruments of Accession which gave the Government of India the power to pass laws in respect of all matters that fell within the seventh schedule of the Government of India Act 1935.

He played a vital role in India's partition and political integration. Later in his life, he became a member of the free-market–oriented Swatantra Party.

Early life and career
The son of a school headmaster Chunangad Shankara Menon, in Kerala, Menon worked as a railway stoker, coal miner and Bangalore tobacco company clerk. Menon joined the Provincial Civil Service (PCS) in 1914. He served as Assistant Secretary to the Government of India in the Reforms Office from 1933 to 1934. He later served as Under Secretary from 1934 to 1935, Deputy Secretary from 1935 to 1940, Joint secretary to the Government of India from 1941 to 1942. By working assiduously, Menon rose through the ranks to become the highest serving Indian officer in British India.

Menon served as Joint Secretary to the Simla Conference in June 1945. In 1946, he was appointed Political Reforms Commissioner to the British Viceroy.

In Patrick French's India: A Portrait, a biographical book on the Indian Subcontinent, it is mentioned that VP Menon moved in with his Keralite friends after his wife left him and returned to south India. The two friends, who were a couple, had arranged his marriage and helped raise his two sons – Pangunni Anantan Menon and Pangunni Shankaran Menon. When the husband died, Menon married his widow.

Menon was given the title of Rao Bahadur, appointed a CIE in the 1941 Birthday Honours  and a CSI in the 1946 Birthday Honours. He was offered a knighthood as a Knight Commander of the Order of the Star of India (KCSI) in a final imperial honours list in 1948, but refused. In a formal statement to the outgoing British authorities, Menon declined the knighthood, stating that with Indian independence, he had entered the service of the new Indian government. According to his grandson, however, Menon later privately told his daughter-in-law he could not accept a knighthood for having caused the partition of his country.

Partition of India

Menon was the political advisor of the last Viceroy of India, Lord Louis Mountbatten. When the interim Government had collapsed due to the rivalry between the Indian National Congress and the Muslim League, Menon had proposed to Mountbatten, Jawaharlal Nehru and Sardar Vallabhbhai Patel, the Indian leaders, the Muslim League's plan to partition India into two independent nations - India and Pakistan.

Menon's resourcefulness during this period caught the eye of Sardar Patel, who would become the Deputy Prime Minister of India in 1947.

VP Menon was present at the meeting between Lord Mountbatten and Hanwant Singh, Maharaja of Jodhpur. It was at this meeting that Hanwant Singh signed the instrument of accession to India. After he had signed and the Viceroy Mountbatten left, only Menon was in the room with him. The Maharaja took out a .22 calibre pistol and pointed it at Menon and said 'I refuse to take your dictation'. Menon told him that he would be making a very serious mistake by threatening him and would not be able to get the accession abrogated in any case.

On 25 October, V.P Menon arrived at Srinagar to assess the situation of Kashmir and advised Maharaja Hari Singh to proceed to Jammu as invaders were very close to Srinagar. Maharaja Hari Singh left from Srinagar to Jammu on the same night. V.P Menon along with Mehr Chand Mahajan (Prime Minister J&K) left for New Delhi by air on the morning of 26th October. On arriving at New Delhi, Lord Mountbatten assured militarily intervention in J&K only after instrument of accession were signed. V.P Menon then left from New Delhi to Jammu by air on the afternoon of 26th October, secured signature on the legal documents, returning that evening by air to New Delhi. Next day, on 27th October Lord Mountbatten accepted the accession of the Princely State of Jammu & Kashmir to India and Indian Army landed on Srinagar airport on the same day.

Integration of India

After the independence of India, Menon became the secretary of the Ministry of the States, headed by Sardar Vallabhbhai Patel, with whom he had developed a bond of trust. Patel respected Menon's political genius and work ethic, while Menon obtained the respect for his work that a civil servant needs from his political superior.

Menon worked closely with Patel over the political integration of India, in which, over 565 princely states were merged into the union of India, managing the diplomacy between the States Ministry and the various Indian princes, acting as Patel's envoy and striking deals with reluctant princes and rulers. Patel respected Menon's ingenuity in diplomacy, and often did not question if Menon exceeded any instructions.

Menon also worked with Patel over the military action against the hostile states of Junagadh and Hyderabad, as well as advising Nehru and Patel on relations with Pakistan and the Kashmir conflict. The Cabinet had dispatched Menon to obtain the accession of Kashmir into India in 1947.

Later years

After his stint as Secretary, he was Governor of Odisha (Orissa then) for a short period in 1951. He authored a book on the political integration of India, The Story of the Integration of Indian States and on the partition of India, Transfer of Power. He later joined the Swatantra Party, but never contested the elections. Menon died on 31 December 1965 at the age of 72.

In popular culture
Indian actor Ashish Vidyarthi portrayed Menon in the 1993 film Sardar, based on the life of Indian statesman Vallabhbhai Patel.

In 2020, his great granddaughter Narayani Basu wrote a biography on him named, V. P. Menon: The Unsung Architect of Modern India.

Bibliography
 Menon, V.P (1956), The Story of the Integration of the Indian States, Orient Longman Ltd, Madras 
 Menon, V.P (1957), The Transfer of Power in India, Orient Longman Ltd, Madras

Further reading

References

1893 births
1965 deaths
People from Ottapalam
Indian civil servants
Indian Civil Service (British India) officers
Governors of Odisha
Companions of the Order of the Indian Empire
Companions of the Order of the Star of India
Indian independence activists from Kerala
People of the 1947 Kashmir conflict
Swatantra Party politicians